In football, "The Invincibles" is a nickname used to refer to the Preston North End team of the 1888–89 season, managed by William Sudell, and the Arsenal team of the 2003–04 season managed by Arsène Wenger.  Preston North End earned the nickname after completing an entire season undefeated in league and cup competition (27 games), while Arsenal were undefeated in the league (38 games) in a run that stretched to a record 49 games. The actual nickname of the Preston team was the "Old Invincibles" but both versions have been in use.

Preston North End

Preston North End became known as "The Invincibles" after they won the inaugural Football League competition in 1888–89, completing the season unbeaten in both the league and the FA Cup, so becoming the first team ever to achieve the "Double". Preston's league record was 18 wins, 4 draws, and 0 losses out of 22 games played, while in the FA Cup they won all 5 of their matches without conceding a single goal. Preston achieved this with a squad primarily composed of Scottish players, part of a wave of Scottish footballers in England whom became known as the Scotch Professors.

The following season, Preston won their first league match to stretch their unbeaten league run to 23 games; in their second game they suffered their first-ever league defeat against Aston Villa, losing 5–3. In his autobiography, Tom Finney wrote: "The championship stayed with North End — by now tagged the Old Invincibles — the following year, but runners-up spot had to suffice for the next three seasons".

Of the seven teams to have completed the Double in England, Preston remain the only one to have done so unbeaten. In 2008, Preston opened a new 5,000 seater stand at their Deepdale stadium, named the Invincibles Pavilion in honour of the unbeaten 1880s team that had also played their home matches at the same site.

The Preston team that won the 1889 FA Cup Final at Kennington Oval, beating Wolverhampton Wanderers 3–0, was as follows:

Matches

Football League

FA Cup

Arsenal

In May 2002, Arsenal beat Manchester United to regain the Premier League and equal Preston's record of not losing an away match all season. In assessing the team's achievement, Tim Rich of The Independent wrote: "Invincibles, they called the last team to go through a season unbeaten away from home, although it is a word which belongs far more to the Arsenal side of 2001-02 than it ever could to the Preston team of 1888–89." Arsenal manager Arsène Wenger wanted his team to push on for more honours and described the defeat of Manchester United as a "shift of power" in English football. The team began the following season in good stead; a 4–1 win against Leeds United in September 2002 meant Arsenal broke the domestic record for scoring in consecutive games (47), and away league games without defeat (22). Such was their effective start to the campaign, Wenger reiterated his belief that Arsenal could remain the whole season undefeated: 

After breaking a Premier League record of 30 matches unbeaten, Arsenal lost to Everton in October 2002 (the decisive goal was struck in the last minute by Wayne Rooney, the first at senior level for the player who would go on to become England's record scorer), and failed to win their next three matches in all competitions, representing their worst run of form in 19 years. By March 2003, Arsenal had established themselves as league leaders, but nearest challenger Manchester United overhauled them to win the title. Arsenal finished the season with league wins against Southampton and Sunderland and were later consoled with success in the FA Cup – they beat the former team 1–0 in the 2003 final.

Wenger sought to strengthen his team with minor additions: goalkeeper Jens Lehmann, as well as a number of young players from academies abroad, namely Gaël Clichy and Phillipe Senderos. In comparison to their rivals Chelsea, bankrolled by new owner Roman Abramovich, and Manchester United, Arsenal's transfer activity was quiet. The financial constraints that came with the Ashburton Grove stadium project meant Wenger had little income to spend on new players. Once funding was found amidst the season, the club added to its roster, with José Antonio Reyes arriving in the winter transfer window.

In the 2003–04 season, Arsenal regained the Premier League without a single defeat. Over the 38 games played, their league record stood at 26 wins, 12 draws and 0 losses. The unbeaten run came close to ending six matches into the campaign against Manchester United, as striker Ruud van Nistelrooy missed a penalty in injury time; the match then ended 0–0. At the turn of the calendar year, Arsenal won nine league matches in a row to consolidate first position; they secured their status as champions with a draw against local rivals Tottenham Hotspur in April 2004. Their form did not continue into the domestic cups; Arsenal exited the semi-final stage of the Football League Cup and the FA Cup to eventual winners Middlesbrough and Manchester United, respectively. In Europe, Arsenal lost two of their opening three UEFA Champions League group stage matches, 3–0 at home to Internazionale and 2–1 away to Dynamo Kyiv, but eventually finished top of the group. Arsenal ultimately reached the quarter-final stage of the Champions League, where they were eliminated by London rivals Chelsea.

Continuing into the next season, a special gold version of the Premier League trophy was commissioned to commemorate Arsenal winning the title without a single defeat. In May 2018, this gold trophy was presented to Arsene Wenger as a gift from Arsenal Football Club at Wenger's final home game as manager after 22 years.  In addition to their two wins at the end of the 2002–03 FA Premier League, Arsenal beat Middlesbrough in their second league game of 2004–05 to equal Nottingham Forest's record of 42 league matches unbeaten; the feat was eclipsed with a win at home to Blackburn Rovers. The run extended to six more matches for a total of 49 league games undefeated, before coming to an end with a controversial 2–0 defeat to Manchester United. The Guardian noted that Arsenal never trailed in the last 20 minutes of a game during their unbeaten run.

Formation

Of the players from Arsenal's double-winning side of 1998, only Patrick Vieira and Dennis Bergkamp remained as first team players throughout the unbeaten run; Martin Keown featured briefly, while Ray Parlour made 25 league appearances. Defenders Lee Dixon and Tony Adams had retired from professional football in 2002 and goalkeeper David Seaman joined Manchester City a year later. Kolo Touré, signed as a right-back and defensive midfielder, was chosen to play in central defence alongside Sol Campbell after impressing during pre-season. Lauren, who had played as a midfielder for Real Mallorca, was shifted to right-back when he joined Arsenal. Wenger initially replaced left-back Nigel Winterburn with Sylvinho, but an injury to the defender allowed Ashley Cole to take his place as first pick by the 2000–01 season. In midfield Gilberto Silva partnered Vieira, with Freddie Ljungberg and Robert Pires playing either side of them on the wings. Thierry Henry, signed as Nicolas Anelka's replacement in 1999, was the team's focal point in attack; he was supported most often by Bergkamp.

Although the team were interpreted as one who organised themselves in a 4–4–2, their formation with the ball was closer to a 4–4–1–1. Wenger's tactics emphasised attacking football and relied on movement and interchanging, with full-backs joining in attacks. Journalist Michael Cox noted that Arsenal's strengths lay on the left side of the pitch, and added that, because the opposition focused on containing Cole, Pires, and Henry, this allowed Lauren and Ljungberg to find space for crosses. Arsenal were also strong on the counter-attack, exemplified in their away performances against Leeds United and Tottenham Hotspur.

Matches
Premier League

See also
1888–89 FA Cup
1888–89 Football League
1889 World Championship (football)
2004–05 UEFA Champions League
2004 FA Community Shield
Perfect season
Longest unbeaten runs

Notes

References

Arsenal F.C.
Preston North End F.C.
Nicknamed groups of association football players
1888–89 in English football
2003–04 FA Premier League